Nome Census Area is a census area located in the U.S. state of Alaska, mostly overlapping with the Seward Peninsula. As of the 2020 census, the population was 10,046, up from 9,492 in 2010. It is part of the unorganized borough and therefore has no borough seat. Its largest community by far is the city of Nome.

Geography
It also includes the large offshore St. Lawrence Island, which has about 14 percent of the census area's population and two of its larger cities in Gambell and Savoonga. Nome Census 
Area is the 7th largest county-equivalent in the state of Alaska.

Adjacent boroughs and census areas
 Northwest Arctic Borough, Alaska - north
 Yukon-Koyukuk Census Area, Alaska - east
 Kusilvak Census Area, Alaska - south
 Chukotsky District, Chukotka Autonomous Okrug - west

National protected areas
 Alaska Maritime National Wildlife Refuge (part of the Bering Sea unit)
 Besboro Island
 King Island
 Sledge Island
 Bering Land Bridge National Preserve (part)
 Yukon Delta National Wildlife Refuge (part)
 Andreafsky Wilderness (part)

Demographics

As of the census of 2000, there were 9,196 people, 2,693 households, and 1,898 families living in the census area.  The population density was 0.3 people per square mile (0.1/km2).  There were 3,649 housing units at an average density of 0/sq mi (0/km2).  The racial makeup of the census area was 19.32% White, 0.38% Black or African American, 75.20% Native American, 0.67% Asian, 0.02% Pacific Islander, 0.20% from other races, and 4.21% from two or more races.  1.00% of the population were Hispanic or Latino of any race. 16.32% reported speaking a Yupik language at home, while 8.75% speak Inupiaq; a further 2.02% reported speaking "Eskimo", a term that covers both Yupik and Inupiaq.

Of the 2,693 households, 45.80% had children under the age of 18 living with them, 42.40% were married couples living together, 15.30% had a female householder with no husband present, and 29.50% were non-families. 23.20% of households were one person, and 3.30% were one person aged 65 or older.  The average household size was 3.33 and the average family size was 4.01.

In the census area the population was spread out, with 37.10% under the age of 18, 9.30% from 18 to 24, 29.00% from 25 to 44, 18.60% from 45 to 64, and 5.90% 65 or older.  The median age was 28 years. For every 100 females, there were 117.60 males.  For every 100 females age 18 and over, there were 122.70 males.

2020 Census

Communities

Cities

Brevig Mission
Diomede
Elim
Gambell
Golovin
Koyuk
Nome
Savoonga
Shaktoolik
Shishmaref
St. Michael
Stebbins
Teller
Unalakleet
Wales
White Mountain

Census-designated place
 Port Clarence

Unincorporated communities
Haycock
Solomon

See also
List of airports in the Nome Census Area
Army Peak

References

External links
 Census Area map: Alaska Department of Labor

 
Alaska census areas
Chukchi Sea
Bering Sea